James Allen (March 6, 1952 - December 21, 2019) was a former American football player who was drafted in the 4th round by the Pittsburgh Steelers in the 1974 NFL Draft. A 1970 graduate of Los Angeles High School, Allen played college football at Pierce College and UCLA. Allen was selected by the Pittsburgh Steelers in their celebrated 1974 draft. He played for the Steelers for four seasons, where he was a member of their Super Bowls IX & X teams. He was traded to the Detroit Lions in 1978. His nickname during his playing career was "Spiderman." He was the lead singer on the Lions' 1980 recording of Another One Bites the Dust. 
Briefly homeless at one time, Allen lived in southern California.  
Allen was elected to the Pierce College Hall of Fame in 2012.

References

1952 births
2019 deaths
American football safeties
Pierce Brahmas football players
UCLA Bruins football players
Pittsburgh Steelers players
Detroit Lions players
Sportspeople from Clearwater, Florida
Players of American football from Los Angeles